Robyn Orlin (born 1955) is a South African dancer and choreographer, born in Johannesburg.

Nicknamed in South Africa "a permanent irritation", she is well known for reflecting the difficult and complex realities in her country. Integrating different media (text, video, plastic arts) she investigates a certain theatrical reality which has enabled her to find her unique choreographic vocabulary.

Choreographies 

198? : I'm Skilled at the Art of Falling Apart
1990 : If You Can’t Change the World Change Your Curtains
1996 : Naked on a goat (prix FNB Vita)
1999 : Daddy, I’ve Seen This Piece Six Times Before and I Still Don’t Know Why They’re Hurting Each Other 
2000 : F.(Untitled) (On Trying to Understand a Classic) 
2001 : The future may be bright, but it’s not necessarily orange… in collaboration with Ann Crosset
2001 : 'We Must Eat Our Suckers With the Wrapper On' 
2002 : Ski-Fi-Jenni 
2004 : Although I live inside... my hair will always reach towards the sun... in collaboration with Sophiatou Kossoko
2005 : When I Take Off My Skin and Touch the Sky With My Nose, Only Then Can I See Little Voices Amuse Themselves 
2006 : Hey dude... I have talent I'm just waiting for God in collaboration with Vera Mantero 
2007 : L'Allegro, il penseroso ed il moderato (F. Haendel) a piece for Opéra national de Paris - the Paris national Opera
2010 : Call it..Kissed by the Sun..Better still the Revenge of Geography Creation for and with Ibrahim Sissoko;   Première: 19. January 2010 Paris at the Théatre de la Ville - Théâtre des Abesses
2011 : ...Have You Hugged, Kissed and Respected Your Brown Venus Today?
2012 : Beauty Remained for Just a Moment then Returned Gently to Her Starting Position, collaboration with Sylvia Glasser's collective Moving into Dance
2012 : Babysitting tête de cire avec cinq gardiens in Palais des beaux-arts of Lille
2013 : In a World Full of Butterflies, It Takes Balls to Be a Caterpillar... Some Thoughts on Falling...
2014 : Coupé-décalé, collaboration with James Carlès
2016 : And So You See... Our Honourable Blue Sky and Ever Enduring Sun... Can Only Be Consumed Slice By Slice... with Albert Silindokuhle Ibokwe Khoza
2017 : Oh Louis... We Move from the Ballroom to Hell While We Have to Tell Ourselves Stories at Night So That We Can Sleep  with Benjamin Pech
2021 : And when we change... with students of the dance training department of HFMDK (Frankfurt am Main), Birgit Neppl (costumes), Cedrik Fermont (sound design)

Movie 
2005 : Hidden beauties Dirty stories

References

External links 
Robyn Orlin's website
Orlin's agent's website
About the movie Hidden beauties Dirty stories 

1955 births
Living people
South African female dancers